Alexandra Sergeyevna Ursuliak (born February 4, 1983, Moscow, RSFSR, USSR) is a Russian stage, television, and film actress.

Biography
She was born on February 4, 1983, in Moscow, in the family of director Sergei Ursuliak  and actress Galina Nadirli.

In 2003 she graduated from the acting department of the Moscow Art Theater School (course leaders   Dmitry Brusnikin and Roman Kozak).

Selected filmography
 Sherlock Holmes as Helen (2013)
 Leo and Tig as Tig (voice; since 2016)
 Ekaterina as Darya Nikolayevna Saltykova (2016)
 The Age of Pioneers as Svetlana Leonova (2017)
 Better than Us as Marina (2018)
 Jumpman as judge (2018)

Awards
2014
 Golden Mask: Best Actress (Drama) 
2022
 Golden Eagle Award: Best Actress on Television

References

External links
 

1983 births
Living people
Actresses from Moscow
Russian film actresses
Russian television actresses
Russian stage actresses
21st-century Russian actresses
Russian voice actresses
Moscow Art Theatre School alumni